The seventh European Athletics Team Championships were held from 23 to 25 June 2017.

Super League

Place: Stadium Lille Métropole, Lille, France

Participating countries

Men's events

Women's events

Score table

Final standings

First League
Place: Karls' Stadium, Vaasa, Finland

Participating countries

Men's events

Women's events

Score table

Final standings

Second League
Place: National Sport Center, Tel Aviv, Israel

Participating countries

Men's events

Women's events

Score table

Final standings

Third League
Place: Matthew Micallef St. John Athletics Stadium, Marsa, Malta

Participating countries

 AASSE

No teams were relegated from the Second League after the 2015 edition in order to enlarge it. Although eligible, Albania and Kosovo did not participate.

Men's events

Women's events

Score table

Final standings
After 40/40 events

Promotion was given to Malta following a failed doping test by an athlete (Adela Čomor, BIH).

References

External links
Official Super League site
Official First League site
Official Second League site
Official Third League site

European Athletics Team Championships
Team
European
International athletics competitions hosted by France
2017 in French sport
Sport in Lille
June 2017 sports events in France